Gyula Szabó (born 29 December 1943) is a Hungarian boxer. He competed in the men's bantamweight event at the 1968 Summer Olympics.

References

External links
 

1943 births
Living people
Hungarian male boxers
Olympic boxers of Hungary
Boxers at the 1968 Summer Olympics
Martial artists from Budapest
Bantamweight boxers